The Track ( is a 1975 French thriller–drama film directed by Serge Leroy.

Plot
A young Englishwoman moves to a French village, close to a university where she is to teach. She befriends a local man, who then introduces her to his friends, as they prepare for a wild pig hunt. During the hunt, three of the men encounter the young woman in an abandoned barn and two of them rape her. In the aftermath, she grabs a rifle from one of them and shoots him, before running off, determined to tell the police. The others, including her friend, track her through woods and farmland, to prevent her reaching safety and informing the police of their attack.

Cast 
 Mimsy Farmer as Helen Wells
 Jean-Luc Bideau as Philippe Mansart
 Jean-Pierre Marielle as Albert Danville
 Michael Lonsdale as David Sutter
 Michel Constantin as Capitaine Nimier
 Philippe Leotard as Paul Danville
 Michel Robin as Chamond

References

Sources

External links

1975 films
1970s action thriller films
1970s thriller drama films
French thriller drama films
1970s chase films
1975 drama films
1970s French films